Natalia Permiakova (born 22 May 1970) is a Belarusian biathlete. She competed at the 1994 Winter Olympics and the 1998 Winter Olympics.

References

1970 births
Living people
Biathletes at the 1994 Winter Olympics
Biathletes at the 1998 Winter Olympics
Belarusian female biathletes
Olympic biathletes of Belarus
Place of birth missing (living people)